The tornado outbreak of March 28–31, 2007, also known as the Late-March 2007 tornado outbreak, was a tornado outbreak that took place across the central United States. It developed in the High Plains from South Dakota to central Texas on March 28, 2007, which produced most of the tornadoes. Several more tornadoes were reported the next three days before the system weakened on March 31. It affected western  Nebraska, western Kansas, extreme eastern Colorado, and much of Oklahoma, and Texas. It was the second major outbreak of 2007, four weeks after an outbreak farther east. The outbreak produced 80 confirmed tornadoes, with five deaths and extensive damage being reported.

The activity level was very uncertain for March 29, as it was conditional on the dry line refiring. Despite the squall line remaining intact, several more tornadoes developed. Several more tornadoes developed on March 30 and 31 before the system weakened.

Meteorological synopsis
A powerful mid and upper level system brought terrifically strong wind fields aloft over the southern and central portions of the Great Plains region on March 28. This system was located over the Great Basin and tracked eastward into the central Rocky Mountains during this time frame. Ahead of the system, a dry line developed from a low-pressure area over extreme northeastern Colorado and the Nebraska Panhandle southwards into western Texas. Increasing south to southeasterly winds close and above the surface caused a progressively humid air mass to spread across the western portion of the Great Plains during the afternoon. Unseasonably warm surface temperatures and increased lift ahead of the approaching system supported rapid thunderstorm formations. This altogether allowed for the potential for large hail, damaging winds, and tornadoes.

That afternoon — when the first signs of severe weather developed, tornado watches were issued from South Dakota south to Texas. The advancing dry line and the cold front moving eastward combined to produce explosive supercell development late in the afternoon. Early that evening, supercells containing severe thunderstorms and tornadoes was developed along a nearly continuous line from near Lubbock, Texas to Rapid City, South Dakota. Before the supercells reformed into a squall line late that evening, at least 63 tornadoes were reported, many of which were very large and potentially destructive. Fortunately, the area is sparsely populated, preventing widespread death and destruction. Still, five people were killed.

On March 29, the squall line that moved eastward prevented a major outbreak during the daytime hours. Only a slight risk of severe storms was issued that day. Nonetheless, several tornadoes were reported, with two striking the Oklahoma City metropolitan area with almost no advance warnings issued before they struck. Significant damage was reported there with at least two people hospitalized when their RV was hit and four others injured during a tornado ten minutes later.

Another moderate risk was issued for March 30, this time in south-central Texas into the Mexican state of Coahuila. This was later extended into northern Texas and south-central Oklahoma. At around 2254 UTC, one of the two tornado watches in effect in Texas during the day was lifted, although a watch remained in the state's central and northeastern portions. Later the day, the Oklahoma tornado watch was then extended into eastern Kansas.

A moderate risk was issued for central Texas on March 31 with the storm line continuing through the state, along with Oklahoma and Kansas in a north-eastern direction. This outlook was later changed to a slight risk as the system continued on with a tornado watch in effect in south-eastern Texas. In addition to that, a thunderstorm watch was even in effect for Louisiana. The tornado watch was discontinued around 1504 UTC, although tornado warnings were issued in southeastern Arkansas. Later that day, the system reached the north-central United States. As a result, warnings were issued in Wisconsin, Illinois, and Iowa. As the system continued moving in its north-eastern direction early thatevening, a watch was extended into the north-western portion of Indiana. The system weakened that evening and no tornadoes occurred afterwards; however, NWS officials later confirmed a microburst in the Illinois cities of Carol Stream and Glendale Heights in DuPage County just west of Chicago just before 10:00 PM CDT. Extensive roof and window damage was reported to buildings, including an apartment complex and a church.

Confirmed tornadoes

March 28 event

March 29 event

March 30 event

March 31 event

See also
List of North American tornadoes and tornado outbreaks
Tornadoes of 2007

Notes

References

External links
Storm Prediction Center

F3 tornadoes
Tornadoes of 2007
Tornadoes in Colorado
Tornadoes in Kansas
Tornadoes in Nebraska
Tornadoes in Texas
2007 natural disasters in the United States
March 2007 events in the United States